Phera (English language:The Return) is a 1988 Bengali drama film directed by Buddhadeb Dasgupta based on a story of Bengali novelist Narendranath Mitra. It was entered into the 38th Berlin International Film Festival, competition section.

Plot
The film revolves with the life of Sasanka who lives in mournful life and his relationship with the family.

Cast   
Aloknanda Roy as Saraju 
Kamu Mukherjee as Mantu
Sunil Mukherjee as Rashu
Devika Mukherjee as Jamuna 
Subrata Nandy as Sasanka 
Aniket Sengupta as Kanu

Awards
 1987: National Film Award
 Best Screenplay: Budhdhadeb Dasgupta
 Best Feature Film in Bengali
 Best Child Artist: Aniket Sengupta

References

External links
 

1988 films
Bengali-language Indian films
1988 drama films
Films based on short fiction
Films whose writer won the Best Original Screenplay National Film Award
Best Bengali Feature Film National Film Award winners
1980s Bengali-language films
Films based on works by Narendranath Mitra